Aroop Biswas is an Indian politician and the present Minister for Sports and Youth Affairs, Power in the Government of West Bengal. He is also an MLA, elected from the Tollyganj in the 2006, 2011, 2016 and 2021 West Bengal Legislative Assembly election.

References 

State cabinet ministers of West Bengal
West Bengal MLAs 2006–2011
West Bengal MLAs 2011–2016
University of Calcutta alumni
Bengali Hindus
Politicians from Kolkata
1959 births
Living people
Place of birth missing (living people)
Trinamool Congress politicians from West Bengal
West Bengal MLAs 2016–2021